GSAT-31 is a high-throughput telecommunication satellite developed by the Indian Space Research Organisation (ISRO).

Mission 
The satellite's main communication payload is Ku band and acts as a replacement of the aging INSAT-4CR. The satellite provides advanced telecommunication to the Indian subcontinent. It is used for VSAT networks, television uplinks, digital signage new  gathering, DTH services and other communication systems.  This is the 40th communication satellite launched by ISRO and the 22nd launch of ISRO satellite by Arianespace.

Launch

The satellite was launched through the 103rd flight of Ariane 5 ECA on 5 February 2019 at 21:01 UTC, the vehicle also deployed  Hellas-Sat-4/SaudiGeoSat-1.

The launch of the GSAT-30 and GSAT-31 by Arianespace is expected to cost Rs 950 crore.

Relocation 
In July 2019, GSAT-31 maneuvered to lower its altitude and drifted eastward to reach new slot at 82.95°E on 31 August 2019.

References 

GSAT satellites
Communications satellites in geostationary orbit
Spacecraft launched by India in 2019
Ariane commercial payloads